Gilchrist, Illinois may refer to:
Gilchrist, Fulton County, Illinois, an unincorporated community in Fulton County
Gilchrist, Mercer County, Illinois, an unincorporated community in Mercer County